Clypeaster chesheri is a species of sea urchins of the Family Clypeasteridae. Their armour is covered with spines. Clypeaster chesheri was first scientifically described in 1970 by Serafy.

See also 

 Clypeaster annandalei
 Clypeaster australasiae
 Clypeaster cyclopilus

References 

Animals described in 1970
Clypeaster